Jordan Latham Bone (born November 5, 1997) is an American professional basketball player for the Fort Wayne Mad Ants of the NBA G League. He played college basketball for the Tennessee Volunteers.

High school career
Bone attended The Ensworth School in Nashville, Tennessee, where he played for the private high school's varsity basketball team. He was teammates with future Golden State Warriors player James Wiseman. He was ranked by 247Sports as the 171st overall prospect in his class.

College career
As a freshman playing for the University of Tennessee, Bone averaged 7.2 points and 2.9 assists per game, only to improve on those averages as a sophomore with 7.3 points and 3.5 assists. As a junior, Bone had a breakout season, posting 13.5 points, 5.8 assists, and 3.2 rebounds per game and helping Tennessee to secure a 31–6 season as well as to make a Sweet 16 appearance.  He was named to the Second-team All-SEC. At  season's end, he declared for the 2019 NBA draft and forfeited his remaining year of eligibility.

Professional career

Detroit Pistons (2019–2020)
Bone was selected 57th overall in the 2019 NBA draft by the New Orleans Pelicans, who later traded him to the Detroit Pistons via the Atlanta Hawks and Philadelphia 76ers.

On July 8, 2019, Bone signed a two-way contract with the Pistons. He will split playing time between the Pistons and their NBA G League affiliate, the Grand Rapids Drive. Bone scored 22 points against the Memphis Hustle on December 26, 2019, but suffered a knee injury and missed a game.

Orlando Magic (2020–2021)
On November 27, 2020, Bone signed a two-way contract with the Orlando Magic. On February 3, 2021, the Orlando Magic announced that they had waived Bone.

Delaware Blue Coats (2021) 
On February 6, 2021, the Delaware Blue Coats announced that they had acquired Bone and a 2021–22 third-round pick from the Lakeland Magic in exchange for the returning player right to J.P. Macura, the returning player right to Doral Moore and a 2021–22 second-round pick. He made his debut for the Blue Coats on February 11, 2021.

Beşiktaş (2021)
On August 23, 2021, Bone signed with Beşiktaş Icrypex of the Basketbol Süper Ligi (BSL). He averaged 11.7 points, 3.6 assists, and 3.6 rebounds per game in 11 games.

Basket Zaragoza (2021–2022)
On December 9, 2021, Bone signed with Basket Zaragoza of the Spanish Liga ACB.

Wisconsin Herd (2022–2023)
On November 3, 2022, Bone was named to the opening night roster for the Wisconsin Herd.

Fort Wayne Mad Ants (2023–present)
On February 24, 2023, Bone was traded to the Fort Wayne Mad Ants in exchange for Deividas Sirvydis.

Career statistics

NBA

|-
| style="text-align:left;"|
| style="text-align:left;"|Detroit
| 10 || 0 || 5.3 || .250 || .200 || – || .4 || .8 || .1 || .0 || 1.2
|-
| style="text-align:left;"|
| style="text-align:left;"|Orlando
| 14 || 0 || 14.0 || .426 || .313 || – || 1.7 || 1.3 || .1 || .0 || 4.0
|-
| style="text-align:center;" colspan="2"|Career
| 24 || 0 || 10.4 || .378 || .286 || – || 1.2 || 1.1 || .1 || .0 || 2.8

College

|-
| style="text-align:left;"| 2016–17
| style="text-align:left;"| Tennessee
| 23 || 17 || 19.6 || .372 || .304 || .769 || 1.7 || 2.9 || .5 || 0 || 7.2
|-
| style="text-align:left;"| 2017–18
| style="text-align:left;"| Tennessee
| 35 || 33 || 23.1 || .391 || .380 || .821 || 2.1 || 3.5 || .7 || .1 || 7.3
|-
| style="text-align:left;"| 2018–19
| style="text-align:left;"| Tennessee
| 37 || 37 || 32.9 || .465 || .355 || .835 || 3.2 || 5.8 || .7 || .1 || 13.5
|- class="sortbottom"
| style="text-align:center;" colspan="2"| Career
| 95 || 87 || 26.1 || .424 || .353 || .817 || 2.4 || 4.3 || .7 || .1 || 9.7

References

External links
Tennessee Volunteers bio
NBA Draft Profile

1997 births
Living people
American men's basketball players
American expatriate basketball people in Turkey
Basketball players from Nashville, Tennessee
Beşiktaş men's basketball players
Delaware Blue Coats players
Detroit Pistons players
Grand Rapids Drive players
New Orleans Pelicans draft picks
Orlando Magic players
Point guards
Tennessee Volunteers basketball players